London is divided into 32 boroughs and the City of London. As there are 1,387 Grade II* listed buildings in London they have been split into separate lists for each borough.

See also
 Grade I listed buildings in London
 Grade II listed buildings in London
 :Category:Grade II* listed buildings in London

References
National Heritage List for England

 
London